Hákonardrápa ("drápa of Hákon") is the name of several skaldic poems. Hákon may refer to:

King Hákon the Good

Guthormr sindri's Hákonardrápa was composed in the 10th century in the honour of the king of Norway Hákon the Good.

Jarl Hákon Sigurðarson

Other drápur, written later in the 10th century, praise the Norwegian jarl Hákon Sigurðarson. They were composed by:

Einarr skálaglamm

Hallfreðr vandræðaskáld

Tindr Hallkelsson

Þórleifr jarlsskáld Rauðfeldarson

Only one stanza and a few verses of Þórleifr's work on Hákon survived. The stanza (preserved in Snorri Sturluson's Óláfs saga Tryggvasonar) especially praises the jarl for having sent nine princes to Odin (i.e. killed).

King Hákon Hákonarson

The latest Hákonardrápur refer to the king of Norway Hákon Hákonarson (Hákon the Old). They were composed in the 13th century by:

Gizurr Þorvaldsson

Óláfr Þórðarson hvítaskáld

Óláfr Leggsson svartaskáld

See also

 Hákonarflokkr
 Hákonarkviða
 Hákonarmál

External links
 The eight Hákonardrápur in the original language

Skaldic poems